Bhuragaon-kharupetia bridge is a  proposed concrete road bridge on National Highway 715A (NH 715A) over the Brahmaputra River in Assam. It will connect Kharupetia in Darrang district on the northern bank with Bhuragaon in Morigaon District on the southern bank.

Location
The Bhuragaon-Kharupetia Bridge will be situated 21 km downstream of Bhuragaon and Kharupetia, spans the Brahmaputra River and will connect the town of Bhuragaon in the south to Kharupetia to the river's north. The bridge will be located over 77 km away from the Assam-Bhutan border and acts as an alternative to the Kolia Bhomora Setu, Tezpur.

Connectivity

Road
A new national highway starting from Jagiroad (Morigaon) to Samrang (Indo-Bhutan border) was proposed by the Government of India on 2014 through a gazetted notification.

It is a spur road of National Highway 15. NH-715A traverses the state of Assam in India.

Rail
Nearest Railway Station from Bhuragaon-Kharupetia Bridge was Mairabari Railway Station.The distance between Bhuragaon and Mairabari was 22 Km. There was an Passanger train, Guwahati - Mairabari Kolongpar Passenger (55603) from Mairabari Railway Station via Haibargaon-Chaparmukh Line.

Another important railway station from Bhuragaon is Jagiroad. Which was situated Approximately 42Km South-West of Bhuragaon.

The Guwahati-Lumding line of Indian Railway passes through Jagiroad Railway Station. Many intercity and passenger trains have stoppage in this station.

History
Several places named Khalingduar, Chari Duar and Chaiduar to the north of Mangaldai and Tezpur sub-divisions prove that these were the dwaram (roads) from the Himalayas and were used to travel to heaven in ancient times.The name of Darrang District originated from these ancient places called Dwaram or Dwar. it means Roads. There are still two roads to the mountains, through Khekheria Bagicha in the north of Mangaldai sub-division and near Bhairabkunda in the north of Udalguri District.

There was an ancient route from china along the course of the lohit river to Assam. Chinese records of about 248 A.D mentions a trade route from Yunnan, South China through hukong valley To Bhairabkunda, Udalguri District. The route from Lhasa took two months to reach Chounahat to Assam And they traded mainly in silk. This ancient route generally called seres-cirradoi Road or simply Indo-Tibet Silk Road.

According to Scholar Late Dineswar Sarma, the word Darrang came from Dawrang which means Gateway, As the traders from different parts of China, Tibet, Bhutan & Central Asia flocked to Assam through this route. Sir Edward Gate 
also mentioned a short-road from Odalguri to Tibet.

The Sharchops of Tashigang, Dundsan, Orong and Yangtse used to trade in a small Indian border town in Assam called Gudama (current day darranga or Darrangamela, better known as Mela Bazar).

Current status

Future
Further it will be connected to jomotsangkha via Samrang-Jomotsangkha Highway. Construction of the 58 km highway starts from Samrang to Rongchuthang in Jomotshangkha, Bhutan.

In addition to its practical benefits, the Bhuragaon-Kharupetia Bridge will have a significant impact on the social and cultural fabric of the region. It will bring the people of Bhuragaon and Kharupetia closer together, facilitating cultural exchanges and allowing people from both towns to visit each other more frequently. The bridge will also make it easier for people to access essential services such as healthcare and education, as both towns will have resources that can be shared.

Importance
The proposed highway will boost tourism and trade in both North Eastern States of India and Bhutan. The Indo-bhutan Highway was an important project for India to Protect it's border from China. Owing to its strategic importance, it was also built with supporting the movement of tanks and aircraft in mind.

The Bhuragaon-Kharupetia Bridge will  also opened up new avenues for commerce and trade. The towns of Bhuragaon and Kharupetia are known for their agricultural produce, and the bridge will made it easier for farmers to transport their goods to nearby markets. The bridge will also led to the growth of small businesses in the area, as it will provided easier access to resources and customers.

See also
 List of bridges on Brahmaputra River
National Highway-715A
Brahmaputra River
Bhuragaon
Morigaon District

References

Bridges in India